Elections to the French National Assembly were held in the Comoros on 5 March 1967. The result was a victory for the List for the French Republic, which won both seats. The seats were taken by Saïd Ibrahim Ben Ali and Mohamed Ahmed.

Results

References

Comoros
Elections in the Comoros
1967 in the Comoros